Poovachal Khader (25 December 1948 – 22 June 2021) was a Malayalam lyricist from Kerala who worked mainly in Malayalam film industry. His first movie as a lyricist was Kaattuvithachavan (1973) but his first released movie was Chuzhi (1973).

Biography

Khader was born on Christmas day in 1948, in a village named Poovachal in the present-day Thiruvananthapuram district. His original name is Muhammed Abdul Khader. His parents are Aboobacker Pillai and Rabiyathul Adabiya Beevi. Chuzhi released in 1973 under the musical direction of M. S. Baburaj was the first movie released after Poovachal Khader entered the industry as a lyricist and was proud of having written lyrics for more than 900 songs in the Malayalam film industry. He, along with Bichu Thirumala, dominated the Malayalam film industry for more than a decade. Peter Reuben, A. T. Ummer, Shyam, K. V. Mahadevan, G. Devarajan, K. Raghavan, M. K. Arjunan, Raveendran, Johnson, MG Radhakrishnan, Gangai Amaran, Raghu Kumar, Jerry Amaldev, Ilayaraja and Shankar–Ganesh have set tunes to his lyrics whereby his works have been musically voiced by vocal maestros like K. J. Yesudas, P. Jayachandran, Vani Jairam, S. Janaki, K. S. Chithra, P. Susheela, P. Madhuri, Unni Menon and Lathika. In 2006, Khader received the Kerala Sangeetha Nataka Akademi Award.

Khader died from a heart attack on 22 June 2021, at the age of 72. He also had tested positive for COVID-19 and was undergoing treatment for it at the time of death. He also suffered from numerous comorbidities. He was buried with full state honours at the Juma Masjid in his birthplace. He is survived by his wife and two daughters.

Complete Discography

References 

1948 births
2021 deaths
Indian male songwriters
20th-century Indian composers
Malayalam-language lyricists
Film musicians from Kerala
21st-century Indian composers
20th-century male musicians
21st-century male musicians
People from Thiruvananthapuram district
Deaths from the COVID-19 pandemic in India
Recipients of the Kerala Sangeetha Nataka Akademi Award